Do You Come Here Often? may refer to:

 "Do You Come Here Often?" (song), by The Tornados
 Do You Come Here Often? (novel), by Alexandra Potter
 Do You Come Here Often? (play), by Sean Foley and Hamish McColl